Flakstadvåg Chapel is a chapel of the Church of Norway in Senja Municipality in Troms og Finnmark county, Norway.  It is located in the village of Flakstadvåg on the west coast of the island of Senja. It is an annex chapel for the Torsken parish which is part of the Senja prosti (deanery) in the Diocese of Nord-Hålogaland. The white, wooden chapel was built in a long church style in 1925 by an unknown architect. The chapel seats about 150 people.

History
The chapel was originally located on the island of Hallvardsøya, south of Flakstadvåg in what is now part of Tranøy Municipality. The chapel was built on the island by Anton Nilsa to serve the fishermen living there. As the population on the island dwindled and the church was deteriorating due to little maintenance, the decision was made to move it to the nearby village of Flakstadvåg on the island of Senja. After moving it to its new location, it was consecrated on 17 June 1926.

See also
List of churches in Nord-Hålogaland

References

Senja
Churches in Troms
Wooden churches in Norway
20th-century Church of Norway church buildings
Churches completed in 1925
1925 establishments in Norway
Long churches in Norway